Burris Franklin DeBenning (September 21, 1936 – May 26, 2003) was an American character actor who worked in both film and television.

Early years
The son of Mr. and Mrs. M.J. DeBenning, he was born in Seminole, Oklahoma, and grew up in Stillwater. He enrolled at Oklahoma State University as a business major, but he switched to drama midway through his second year and went on to have major roles in several plays at OSU. After serving in the United States Air Force, he went to New York University and earned a master's degree in drama.

Career 
DeBenning first acted professionally in an off-Broadway play that lasted four days. He next joined a professional troupe in Boston.

DeBenning appeared in nearly 100 films and TV shows including the television films The House on Greenapple Road (1970), Brinks: The Great Robbery (1976) and Hanging by a Thread (1979). He appeared in such television programs as CHiPs, Custer, Nakia, Matlock, Matt Houston, Mike Hammer, Magnum, P.I.,  Rockford Files, Kojak, The Streets of San Francisco, Hawaii Five-O, Matt Helm, Medical Center, McCloud, Ironside, Columbo and Medical Story. In 1969 DeBenning appeared as Orrey Hills on the TV series The Virginian in the episode titled "Journey to Scathelock." He also co-starred with Robert Wagner in City Beneath the Sea (1971).

His film appearances included a memorable turn as a comic prone Marine in Beach Red (1967), Sweet November (1968), St. Ives (1976), The Incredible Melting Man (1977), Armed Response (1986), A Nightmare on Elm Street 5: The Dream Child (1989), and Love Field (1992). He played Lt. Jim Porter, a Navy Intelligence agent, in the 1978 science fiction TV miniseries, The Return of Captain Nemo, originally shown on U.S. TV as a three part miniseries (50-minutes each episode) and later released theatrically outside the U.S. in a 102-minute widescreen version renamed The Amazing Captain Nemo. From 1981-82, he played evil town boss Paul Garrett (and later his equally evil twin brother, Richard Garrett) in the TV series Father Murphy.

Personal life
DeBenning was married to actress Susan Silo.

Death
DeBenning died in San Luis Obispo, California at age 66 from undisclosed causes.

Filmography

References

External links

1936 births
2003 deaths
People from Stillwater, Oklahoma
American male film actors
American male soap opera actors
American male television actors
Male actors from Oklahoma
20th-century American male actors